Williams Creek is a town in Washington Township, Marion County, Indiana. Williams Creek was originally planned as an exclusive community for the wealthy in 1925, and it was incorporated as a town in 1932. The population was 407 at the 2010 census. It has existed as an "included town" since 1970, when it was incorporated into Indianapolis as part of Unigov. It is part of Indianapolis, but retains a functioning town government under IC 36-3-1-11. Williams Creek remains an exclusive wooded residential enclave for the wealthy. It was also where American writer Kurt Vonnegut's parents lived when he wrote a letter home from Europe after surviving the bombing of Dresden as a POW.

Geography
Williams Creek is located at  (39.901439, -86.149371). The wooded area includes a stream, also named Williams Creek, that flows through the neighboring town of Meridian Hills and meets the White River in Marott Park.

Demographics

2010 census
As of the census of 2010, there were 407 people, 146 households, and 119 families living in the town. The racial makeup of the town was 96.1% White, 1.0% African American, 1.5% Asian, 0.5% from other races, and 1.0% from two or more races. Hispanic or Latino of any race were 2.5% of the population.

There were 146 households, of which 33.6% had children under the age of 18 living with them, 78.1% were married couples living together, 2.1% had a female householder with no husband present, 1.4% had a male householder with no wife present, and 18.5% were non-families. 15.1% of all households were made up of individuals, and 11% had someone living alone who was 65 years of age or older. The average household size was 2.79 and the average family size was 3.12.

The median age in the town was 46.8 years. 30.2% of residents were under the age of 18; 2.7% were between the ages of 18 and 24; 14.2% were from 25 to 44; 32.4% were from 45 to 64; and 20.4% were 65 years of age or older. The gender makeup of the town was 49.4% male and 50.6% female.

2000 census
As of the census of 2000, there were 413 people, 157 households, and 127 families living in the town. The racial makeup of the town was 97.58% White, 0.24% African American, 0.73% Asian, 0.24% from other races, and 1.21% from two or more races.

There were 157 households, out of which 35.0% had children under the age of 18 living with them, 75.8% were married couples living together, 4.5% had a female householder with no husband present, and 19.1% were non-families. 12.1% of all households were made up of individuals, and 7.6% had someone living alone who was 65 years of age or older. The average household size was 2.63 and the average family size was 2.91.

In the town, the population was spread out, with 25.2% under the age of 18, 3.9% from 18 to 24, 18.6% from 25 to 44, 36.1% from 45 to 64, and 16.2% who were 65 years of age or older. The median age was 46 years. For every 100 females, there were 87.7 males. For every 100 females age 18 and over, there were 87.3 males.

The median income for a household in the town was $172,996, and the median income for a family was $186,766. Males had a median income of $100,000 versus $49,583 for females. The per capita income for the town was $82,132. None of the families and 1.2% of the population were living below the poverty line, including no under eighteens and none of those over 64.

References 

Towns in Marion County, Indiana
Towns in Indiana
Indianapolis metropolitan area